George Collins was an English football manager. He managed Gillingham from 1919 to 1920 and Darlington from 1933 to 1936. There is no record of him having played football at a professional level.

Honours
Darlington
 Third Division (North) Cup: 1933–34
 Third Division (North) Cup runner-up: 1935–36

Managerial stats

References

Year of birth missing
Year of death missing
English football managers
Gillingham F.C. managers
Darlington F.C. managers